Francesco Dentice (died 1505) was a Roman Catholic prelate who served as Bishop-elect of Cariati e Cerenzia (1504–1505).

Biography
On 7 Mar 1504, Francesco Dentice was appointed during the papacy of Pope Julius II as Bishop of Cariati e Cerenzia.
He died in 1505 before he was consecrated.

References

External links and additional sources
 (for Chronology of Bishops) 
 (for Chronology of Bishops) 

Bishops appointed by Pope Julius II
1505 deaths